Champany is a hamlet in Falkirk, on the junctions of the A904 and A803 roads near Linlithgow, West Lothian, Scotland.

See also
Champany Inn

External links

Canmore – Champany Farmstead site record

Villages in Falkirk (council area)